The Leo Belgicus (Latin for Belgic Lion) was used in both heraldry and map design to symbolize the former Low Countries (current day Netherlands, Luxembourg, Belgium and a small part of northern France) with the shape of a lion.

When not in map form, the Leo Belgicus often accompanies the Dutch Maiden, the national personification of the Dutch Republic.  Often both sit in a circular fenced enclosure, the "Garden of Holland". 

Europa regina, showing Europe as a queen, was a comparable schematic.

Terminology 
The names derived from the Belgae (and thus including Belgica) are now mostly identified with the country Belgium; yet before the division of the Low Countries into a southern and a northern half in the 16th century, it was a common name for the entire Low Countries, and was the usual Latin translation of the Netherlands (which at that point covered the current territory of the Netherlands, Luxembourg, Belgium and a small part of northern France). Several somewhat later maps of the Dutch Republic, which consisted of the Northern Netherlands, and therefore has almost no intersection with the present country of Belgium, also show the Latin title Belgium Foederatum. Also, a 17th-century colonial province that was located on the East Coast of North America — which was ruled and settled exclusively by the Dutch Republic and in which the present Belgium had no share — was known in Dutch as  Nieuw-Nederland but in Latin as Nova Belgica or Novum Belgium.

History
The earliest Leo Belgicus was drawn by the Austrian cartographer Michaël Eytzinger in 1583, when the Netherlands were fighting the Eighty Years' War for independence. The motif was inspired by the heraldic figure of the lion, occurring in the coats of arms of several of the Netherlands, namely: Brabant, Flanders, Frisia, Guelders, Hainaut, Holland, Limburg, Luxembourg, Namur and Zeeland, as well as in those of William of Orange.

Eytzinger's map was the first of many. There were three different designs. In the most common one, the lion's head was located in the northeast of the country and the tail in the southeast. The most famous version is that of Claes Janszoon Visscher, which was published in 1609 on the occasion of the Twelve Years' Truce. A less common design reversed the position of the lion, as shown in the Leo Belgicus by Jodocus Hondius.

The third version was published in the later stages of the war, and after the independence of the Dutch Republic was confirmed in the Peace of Westphalia (1648). It is called the Leo Hollandicus, the Holland Lion, and shows only the province of Holland. One of the earliest versions was published by Visscher around 1625.

References

Gallery

See also

 Coat of arms of Belgium
 Belgian heraldry
 Dutch Republic Lion

External links

 Several versions of the map, Leiden University
 See : Leo Belgicus maps in Antique Map Price and high resolution image source by Swaen.com.

Historic maps of Europe
Maps of the Netherlands
Geographic history of Belgium
Images of Belgium
Maps of the history of Europe
Lions in heraldry
Cartography in the Dutch Republic
Lions in art
Early modern Netherlandish cartography